Henry Mong, also known as Heng Li Henry Mong (was an American surgeon and Presbyterian missionary who built mission hospitals in China.

Timeline
 1907 – The Presbyterian Church (USA) established the True Faith Hospital in Guangdong, South China. Mong was entrusted with running the mission hospital.
 1922 – Mong tasked by Presbyterian Board of Foreign Missions to set up a mission hospital in Zhenjiang, Jiangsu, the forerunner of the City's First People's Hospital.
 1924 – Elected Secretary General of the Red Cross Society of Zhenjiang City.

References

Year of birth missing
Year of death missing
American surgeons
American Presbyterian missionaries
American Presbyterian ministers
Presbyterian missionaries in China
American expatriates in China
Christian medical missionaries